CGM-121B Seek Spinner was a U.S. harassment drone or a kamikaze-drone as it was referred to at the time it was designed, developed by Boeing out of its CQM-121 Pave Tiger UAV. The main difference from the basic model was its seeker head, and its explosive payload, while aerodynamic characteristics had only minor changes. Although it was several times cheaper than its main rival, Tacit Rainbow drone, Seek Spinner never became operational.

Mission
According to Gen. Lawrence A. Skantze, Seek Spinner was designed for the suppression of enemy air defenses by employing swarming tactics in order to suppress enemy capability to track and engage the overwhelming number of Seek Spinners launched simultaneously, by that even 1:20 hit ratio out of thousand Seekers launched in a single salvo was to be considered a highly successful result, enough to wipe out Soviet radars.

Specifications (YCGM-121B)

Links

 Boeing flies Seek Spinner

Boeing military aircraft
Canard aircraft
Low-wing aircraft
Single-engined pusher aircraft
Unmanned military aircraft of the United States
1980s United States special-purpose aircraft